Lake Valencia may refer to:

Lake Valencia (Peru), a lake in Peru
Lake Valencia (Pinellas County, Florida), a tiny lake in Pinellas County, Florida
Lake Valencia (Venezuela), a large lake in Venezuela